Glassford Peak, at  above sea level is the third highest peak in the Boulder Mountains of Idaho. It is the 39th highest peak in Idaho.

The peak is most easily accessed from south of Idaho State Highway 75 between Stanley and Challis. However, it can also be accessed from State Highway 75 north of Ketchum.

References 

Mountains of Idaho
Mountains of Custer County, Idaho
Sawtooth National Forest